The King Cash Spiel, formerly the Golden Ears Curling Classic, and the Coronation Group Classic is an annual cashspiel, or curling tournament, that takes place at the Golden Ears Curling Club in Maple Ridge, British Columbia. The event has been on and off again as part of the World Curling Tour, and has been held since 1981. The tournament is held in a round robin format.

Past champions

Men

Women

References

Women's curling competitions in Canada
Curling in British Columbia
Maple Ridge, British Columbia